Hosh Arab or Hawsh Arab is a Syrian village in the Al-Tall District of the Rif Dimashq Governorate. According to the Syria Central Bureau of Statistics (CBS), Hosh Arab had a population of 2,073 in the 2004 census. Its inhabitants are predominantly Sunni Muslims.

References

Bibliography

Populated places in Al-Tall District